The Mexico Toros were an indoor soccer team based in Mexico City that played in the Continental Indoor Soccer League. They played only one season in 1995. Their home arena was Palacio de los Deportes.

Year-by-year

References

Defunct indoor soccer teams
Continental Indoor Soccer League teams
Defunct football clubs in Mexico City
Mexican indoor football teams
1995 establishments in Mexico
1995 disestablishments in Mexico
Association football clubs established in 1995
Association football clubs disestablished in 1995